The Kiss  (original Dutch title: De kus) is a 2004 Flemish film directed and written by Hilde Van Mieghem.

Principal cast
Marie Vinck as Sarah Lenaerts
Veerle Baetens as Rita
Zakaria Bchiri as little boy
Marc Bogaerts as ballet teacher
Leonie Borgs as Celine Lenaerts
Zoe Cnaepkens as Sarah Lenaerts (young)
Axel Daeseleire as Detective
Jan Decleir as Marcel Lenaerts
Tom De Hoog as doctor
Josse De Pauw as nonkel Hugo
Hilde Van Mieghem as Denise Lenaerts

Trivia
Hilde Van Mieghem and Marie Vinck are mother and daughter.

Awards and nominations

Won
Joseph Plateau Awards
Best Actress (Vinck)

Viareggio EuropaCinema
Best Actress (Vinck)

Nominated
Emden International Film Festival
Emden Film Award - 2nd Place (Van Mieghem) 

Joseph Plateau Awards
Best Belgian Composer (Carlens and Joris)

Belgian thriller drama films
2004 films
2000s Dutch-language films